Atlabara Football Club (Arabic: نادي أطلع برة لكرة القدم) is a South Sudanese football club located in Juba, South Sudan which currently plays in the South Sudan Football Championship. In 2013 the club has won South Sudan Football Championship.

Stadium
Currently the team plays at the 12000 capacity Juba Stadium.

Honours
South Sudan Football Championship: 3
 2013, 2015, 2019.

South Sudan National Cup: 0

South Sudan Super Cup: 0

Performance in CAF competitions
CAF Champions League: 3 appearances
2014 - Preliminary Round 
2017 –  Preliminary Round
2020 – Preliminary Round

CAF Confederation Cup: 0 appearance

Naming
The name of the club (Atlabara, اطلع برة) literally means "get out" in Arabic. Atlabara is a neighbourhood in Juba. The name of this neighborhood is inspired by the incident when the Sudanese military ordered the men living in this neighborhood to "get out" of their houses during the civil war.

External links
Rsssf
Gurtong.net

Football clubs in South Sudan